Jacques Christian or Jacob Christiaan Pielat (sometimes Pielaat) (27 August 1692, Rotterdam – c. 3 August 1740, Loosduinen) was the 22nd Governor of Ceylon during the Dutch colonial time from 2 December 1732 until 27 January 1734.

Pielat was the sixth child of Phinéas Pielat (1645–1700), a Protestant minister originally from the Principality of Orange, and his second wife Jeanne de Vernatti. Pielat joined the Dutch East India Company and worked his way up to opperkoopman (upper-merchant) in the Dutch Indies. From at least 1720 he was captain and charged with the military accompaniment of goods from Patna to the Dutch factory in Hugly in Dutch Bengal. After a period of being secunde ("vice-governor") in Ternate, he succeeded Stephanus Versluys as governor of Amboina from 1728–29 to 1731. Subsequently, he was appointed Extraordinary Councillor of India. and in 1732 he became governor of Ceylon, again succeeding Versluys. After his term as governor he left the customary "memoir" for his successor, Diederik van Domburg, and returned to the Netherlands where he would die 8 years later. He was buried on 6 August 1740 in The Hague. He was married to Amarante/Amarantha van der Elst (born 1690 in Delft) with whom he had children born in Batavia and Ternate. In 1719, Everard Kraeyvanger wrote a poem for Amaranta in consolation for the loss of two of her children in Batavia. His surviving son Diederik Christiaan would become mayor of Schiedam.

References

1692 births
1740 deaths
18th-century Dutch people
Dutch expatriates in Sri Lanka
Governors of Dutch Ceylon
Dutch East India Company people from Rotterdam